Union Sportive Socozaki is a Congolese football club based in Butembo, North Kivu province. 
They were involved in a riot that broke out during a match against rival team Nyuki System in 2008 that led to the deaths of 13 people, mostly children.

References

Football clubs in the Democratic Republic of the Congo
North Kivu